The Valea Mare Cărpinoasa is a right tributary of the river Crișul Pietros in Romania. It flows into the Crișul Pietros near Pietroasa.

References

Rivers of Romania
Rivers of Bihor County